Skal vi danse? returned for a fifth season on September 19, 2009, until November 21, 2009. The winners were Carsten Skjelbried and Elena Bokoreva Wiulsrud.

Couples

Scoring chart

Red numbers indicate the lowest score for each week.
Green numbers indicate the highest score for each week.
 indicates the winning couple.
 indicates the runner-up couple.

Dance schedule
The celebrities and professional partners danced one of these routines for each corresponding week.
 Week 1: Waltz or Cha-Cha-Cha
 Week 2: Quickstep or Samba
 Week 3: Tango or Rumba
 Week 4: Slowfox or Paso Doble 
 Week 5: Jive
 Week 6: One unlearned dance
 Week 7: Showdance
 Week 8: Two unlearned dances
 Week 9: One unlearned dance, one repeated dance
 Week 10: One ballroom dance, one Latin dance, Showdance

Songs
The songs they are going to dance in Skal vi danse? for each week.

Week 1
Individual judges scores in the chart below (given in parentheses) are listed in this order from left to right: Trine Dehli Cleve, Tor Floysvik, Karianne Guilliksen, Christer Tornell.

Week 2

Week 3

Week 4

Week 5

Week 6

Week 7

Week 8

Week 9

Week 10

Call-out Order
The table below lists the order in which the contestants' fates were revealed. The order of the safe couples doesn't reflect the viewer voting results.

 This couple came in first place with the judges.
 This couple came in last place with the judges.
 This couple came in last place with the judges and was eliminated.
 This couple was eliminated.
 This couple won the competition.
 This couple came in second in the competition.

Judges's Votes

Comments to judges
In the finale of season 5 Hallvard Flatland and Alexandra Kakourina responded and answered to questions from viewers to think which judge is the scariest? None of the judges looked creepy and scary.

See also
Skal vi danse?
Skal vi danse? (season 4)
Skal vi danse? (season 6)
Dancing with the Stars

References

External links
Skal vi danse 2009 – TV 2

Skal vi danse?
2009 Norwegian television seasons